Fort Wolters was a United States military installation four miles northeast of Mineral Wells, Texas. Originally named Camp Wolters, it was an Army camp from 1925 to 1946. During World War II, it was for a time the largest infantry replacement training center in the United States, and was commanded by Major General Bruce Magruder.

During World War II, Camp Wolters served as a German POW camp.

After the war, the camp was deactivated for several years. It became an Air Force base in 1951 with the mission of training Air Force engineers.

Camp Wolters was the location where two of the war's most famous enlisted infantrymen underwent basic training - Audie Murphy and Eddie Slovik.

Audie Murphy completed basic training at Camp Wolters. He was one of the most decorated American combat soldiers of World War II, receiving every military combat award for valor available from the U.S. Army, as well as French and Belgian awards for heroism. At the age of 19, Murphy received the Medal of Honor after single-handedly holding off an entire company of German soldiers for an hour at the Colmar Pocket in France in January 1945, then leading a successful counterattack while wounded and out of ammunition.

Also, during World War II on January 24, 1944, Eddie Slovik was sent to Camp Wolters for basic military training. Upon finishing basic training, he was sent to France as a replacement. Slovik was convicted of desertion in November 1944, and, on 31 January 1945, became the first member of the U.S. military since the American Civil War to be executed for desertion.

Special Category Army Personnel With the Air Force (SCARWAF) (1951-1956)
In 1947 the US Air Force's Far East Air Force (FEAF) needed to upgrade older airfields and build new airfields to support operations in Korea. Since the split between the Army and Air Force in 1947 there was no provision for specialized semi-skilled and skilled troops to perform this sort of task. SCARWAF was a provisional Army and Air Force unit that provided personnel who would perform these construction duties.

Camp Wolters was one of the facilities that trained SCARWAF units (and later their Aviation Engineer replacements). It also was used as a storage depot for Air Force equipment.

United States Army Primary Helicopter School (1956-1973)
In 1956, Camp Wolters reverted to the United States Army to house the United States Army Primary Helicopter School. In 1963 it was designated a "permanent" military base and renamed Fort Wolters.

The facility started with one heliport (Main) and 4 stage fields. At its height it had 3 heliports (Main Heliport, Downing Field, and Dempsey Field) and twenty-five stage fields (Pinto, Sundance, Ramrod, Mustang, Rawhide, Bronco, Wrangler, An Khe, Bac Lieu, Ben Cat, Ben Hoa, Cam Ranh, Can Tho, Chu Lai, Da Nang, Hue, My Tho, Phu Loi, Pleiku, Qui Nhon, Soc Trang, Tay Ninh, Tuy Hoa, Vinh Long, and Vung Tau). The Vietnamese-named stage fields were named after facilities in Vietnam and were oriented to be the same relation to each other, on a smaller scale of course, as they were on the map. The other stage fields were Western-themed.

June 1963, the post was re-designated Fort Wolters, a permanent military installation and U.S. Army Primary Helicopter Center.

Postwar
The base was deactivated in 1973. The site is now used as an industrial park with activities including Ventamatic, Ltd, GR's Workshop, a branch of Weatherford College, and a training center for the Texas Army National Guard.  The Texas Department of Criminal Justice also operates a District Parole Office on the site.

See also

 Texas Military Forces
 Texas Military Department
 List of conflicts involving the Texas Military
 Awards and decorations of the Texas Military

List of World War II prisoner-of-war camps in the United States

References

External links

 A Pictorial History of Fort Wolters, hosted by the Portal toTexas History
 
 http://www.fortwolters.com

Closed installations of the United States Army
Military installations closed in 1973
Wolters
Buildings and structures in Palo Pinto County, Texas
Buildings and structures in Parker County, Texas
1925 establishments in Texas
1973 disestablishments in Texas
Texas Military Department
Texas Military Forces
Military installations established in 1925